La Voz Arizona (The Voice) is a newspaper produced in Phoenix, Arizona, in the United States. La Voz Arizona is a sister publication of The Arizona Republic, and it is owned by Gannett.

La Voz Arizona covers the informational needs of the Spanish speaking community in Maricopa County, Arizona, and distributes, free of charge, 60,000 copies every Friday to over 2,000 rack locations at several grocery stores, as well as high traffic shopping centers & restaurants.

La Voz Arizona began publishing in January 2000 and immediately established a reputation in Arizona as a prize-winning newspaper, including multiple winners of the 2003, 2004, and 2005 National Association of Hispanic Publications Latina Journalist of the Year, and the first and only two Latinos inducted to the Hall of Fame of the Arizona Newspapers Association.

La Voz Arizona publishes local and national news information, sports, entertainment, and advertising that includes grocers, jobs, automotive, telecommunications, banking services, and more.

La Voz Arizona is the only Spanish newspaper in Maricopa County audited by VERIFIED.

References 

Hispanic and Latino American culture in Phoenix, Arizona
Newspapers published in Arizona
Spanish-language mass media in Arizona
Spanish-language newspapers published in the United States
Non-English-language newspapers published in Arizona
Newspapers established in 2000
Mass media in Phoenix, Arizona